Converging Lines is a Canadian two-part television documentary which aired on CBC Television in 1977.

Premise
These programmes profiled the Jewish and Islamic faiths, featuring interviews with their respective adherents and providing historical background over two episodes:

 "A People, A Place, A Book" (Louise Lore producer) - Judaism
 "The Surrender" (Herb Krosney producer) - Islam

Scheduling
The two-hour-long episodes were broadcast on 20 and 21 March 1977 at 10:00 p.m. (Eastern).

References

External links
 

CBC Television original programming
Canadian television specials
1977 in Canadian television